The Remarkable Andrew is a 1942 film directed by Stuart Heisler and written by Dalton Trumbo based on his 1941 novel of the same name. It stars Brian Donlevy and William Holden.

Plot
Young bookkeeper Andrew Long is an avid student of American history who reveres former president Andrew Jackson. When Long discovers discrepancies in the municipal financial records and that money is missing, the guilty parties attempt to discredit and imprison him. Long finds his savior when Jackson returns to Earth to help him with the help of several of the Founding Fathers.

Cast
Brian Donlevy as General Andrew Jackson
William Holden as Andrew Long
Ellen Drew as Peggy Tobin
Montagu Love as General George Washington
Gilbert Emery as Mr. Thomas Jefferson
Brandon Hurst as Mr. Chief Justice John Marshall
George Watts as Dr. Benjamin Franklin
Rod Cameron as Jesse James
Jimmy Conlin as Private Henry Bartholomew Smith
Richard Webb as Randall Stevens
Spencer Charters as Dr. Clarence Upjohn
Minor Watson as District Attorney Orville Beamish
Clyde Fillmore as Mayor Ollie Lancaster
Thomas W. Ross as Judge Ormond Krebbs
Porter Hall as Chief Clerk Art Slocumb
Wallis Clark as City Treasurer R. R. McCall
Milton Parsons as Purchase Agent Sam Savage
Helena Phillips Evans as Mrs. Grondos 
Tom Fadden as Jake Pearl 
Harlan Briggs as Sheriff Clem Watkins 
Nydia Westman as Miss Van Buren 
Frances Gifford as Miss Halsey 
Martha O'Driscoll as District Attorney's Secretary 
Chester Conklin as Shopkeeper (uncredited)

References

External links

1942 films
Films directed by Stuart Heisler
1940s fantasy comedy films
American black-and-white films
Films scored by Victor Young
Films based on American novels
Films with screenplays by Dalton Trumbo
American fantasy comedy films
Paramount Pictures films
Films about Andrew Jackson
1942 comedy films
1940s American films